Terminalia neotaliala, the Madagascar almond tree, is a mid-sized tree in the leadwood tree family, Combretaceae. It is an invasive species on the continent of Africa.

References

neotaliala
Endemic flora of Madagascar
Plants described in 1973
Taxa named by René Paul Raymond Capuron